Neil Clement (born 3 October 1978) is an English former professional footballer who spent the majority of his career playing for West Bromwich Albion. He participated in a club record three promotions. His customary position was in defence, but he was also a versatile player who occupied several different positions for Albion. He was also known as a set piece specialist, having scored several goals from free-kicks and penalties. Later in his career, Clement was affected by knee injuries and was forced to retire in January 2010.

Football career

Early career
The son of Dave Clement, the former QPR and England full-back of the 1970s, Neil Clement was born in Reading, Berkshire but later attended Dorridge Junior School and Arden School in the West Midlands. His brother is football coach Paul Clement. As a teenager, Clement obtained a place at The Football Association's School of Excellence at Lilleshall. He had played as a centre-forward up until the age of 14, and only switched to left-back to improve his chances of getting into Lilleshall. He started his career at Chelsea, making his professional début in a 3–1 Premier League win over West Ham on 21 December 1996. This was to be his only league appearance and only start for Chelsea. He failed to make a single appearance during 1997–98, and the following season his contribution to Chelsea was restricted to just two substitute appearances in the League Cup. To gain first team experience, Clement was loaned out to Reading in November 1998, making his début in a 1–0 win at Northampton on 21 November 1998. A week later, on 28 November, he scored his first goal in professional football as Reading beat Lincoln 2–1. He remained with Reading until February 1999, but the following month started another loan spell, this time at Preston North End. He was sent off on his North End début in a 1–0 defeat to Colchester on 2 April 1999.

In 1999–2000, Clement continued to struggle in his attempt to break into the Chelsea first team. In November 1999 he was loaned out to Brentford, making his début in a 4–1 defeat to AFC Bournemouth on 23 November. He returned to Chelsea in January 2000, making one further substitute appearance as the Blues beat Gillingham 5–0 in an FA Cup quarter-final in February.

West Bromwich Albion
On transfer deadline day in March 2000, Clement joined West Bromwich Albion on loan for the rest of the season, making his Albion début in a 2–1 defeat to Manchester City at Maine Road on 25 March. His performances in Albion's successful attempt to avoid relegation from Division One earned him a permanent transfer in July, in a move costing £150,000.

Clement scored his first goal for his new club in a 2–1 first leg win in the League Cup away at Derby County on 19 September 2000. He also scored in the second leg a week later, but Albion lost the tie 5–4 on aggregate. His first league goal for the Baggies came in a 3–2 Hawthorns defeat to Norwich City on 14 October 2000. In all, Clement appeared 52 times for Albion in 2000–01, missing just one game in all competitions and winning the club's Player of the Season award. Albion reached the promotion play-offs, losing in the semi-final to Bolton Wanderers. Clement was again a key player for Albion during 2001–02. As well as converting penalties in Albion's FA Cup victories against Premiership sides Sunderland and Leicester, he missed only one league game as Albion won promotion to the top flight. His efforts were recognised when he was named in the PFA Division One team of the year.

Clement featured heavily once more in 2002–03, missing only two games all season, and although Albion were relegated, he played his part in a second promotion in 2003–04. He scored in successive games at the start of the 2004–05 Premiership season, netting against both Blackburn and Aston Villa. In January 2005 Clement signed a new five-and-a-half-year contract, which would keep him at The Hawthorns until 2010. His teammate Darren Moore credited him with playing a key role in Albion's revival during that season, as the team successfully avoided relegation, and Clement also won the West Bromwich Albion Disabled Supporters Club Player of the Year award. Clement's goal in a 4–0 win against Everton on 19 November 2005 gave him the distinction of being the only Albion player to score in each of the club's first three Premiership seasons, although Albion's 2005–06 campaign ended in relegation. In 2006–07 he played in less than half of West Brom's fixtures and was sent off twice. He came on as an 81st-minute substitute in that season's Championship play-off final at Wembley Stadium, as Albion lost 1–0 to Derby County.

At the end of February 2008, Clement joined Hull City on loan, and made his debut for the Tigers in a 2–1 defeat away at Bristol City. The loan was scheduled to last for the remainder of the season, but Albion exercised an option to recall him to the Hawthorns after 28 days to help their push for promotion. Clement returned to the Albion first team, playing in the final nine games of the season and making his 300th appearance for the club against Queens Park Rangers on the final day of the season. Albion won the match 2–0 and were promoted as champions; Clement thus became the first player to win three promotions with Albion.

Clement was ruled out for the entire 2008–09 season following a new knee injury sustained in Albion's final pre-season match, against Real Mallorca. The injury forced him to announce his retirement from playing football in January 2010.

Horse racing ban
In December 2012 Clement, a racehorse owner, and five other men were charged with serious breaches of the rules of racing by the British Horseracing Authority. The charges related to using inside information to place bets, breaching the rules by backing against his own horse Hindu Kush, and failing to provide requested details to the BHA.

On 22 May 2013, Clement was found guilty of conspiring to commit a corrupt or fraudulent practice, placing a lay bet on a horse which he then owned and failure to provide phone records to the inquiry. He received a BHA ban of fifteen years.

Personal life
Clement married to Rebecca and they have two children together, Olivia  and Ruby Clement.</ref> His father is England and QPR Dave Clement (footballer, born 1948)|Dave Clement]].

Honours
Individual
PFA Team of the Year: 2001–02 First Division

References

External links

England profile at TheFA

1978 births
Living people
Sportspeople from Reading, Berkshire
English footballers
England youth international footballers
Association football defenders
Association football utility players
Chelsea F.C. players
Reading F.C. players
Preston North End F.C. players
Brentford F.C. players
West Bromwich Albion F.C. players
Hull City A.F.C. players
Premier League players
English Football League players
English racehorse owners and breeders
Footballers from Berkshire